Anyonya Co-operative Bank Limited (ACBL) located in the city of Vadodara (formerly Baroda) in Gujarat, is the first co-operative bank in India.
The Reserve Bank of India ordered the bank to stop most of its operations under Section 35 of the Banking Regulation Act, on 14 September 2007, and ACBL closed in March 2008.
Its annual general meeting in September 2008 formed a committee to re-open the bank.

ACBL was established in 1889 under the name Anyonya Sahayakari Mandali Co-operative Bank Limited, with a primary objective of providing an alternative to exploitation by moneylenders for Baroda's residents.

When it was started in 1889 it had just 23 members and 76 Indian rupees (Rs) of capital, which grew to Rs 873 in the first year. By 2006, it had grown to more than 23,000 share holders and more than ten branches which are mainly located within Baroda city and some small towns surrounding it.

Its administration is governed by a group of nine board directors, three of whom are elected every year for a three-year term.

See also
 Co-operative banking
 Banking in India

References

External links

Indian companies established in 1889
Companies based in Vadodara
Banks established in 1889
Cooperative banks of India
Cooperatives in Gujarat
Indian companies disestablished in 2008
Banks disestablished in 2008